The Jackal is a 2010 Turkish action film, directed by Erhan Kozan, about a quiet young boy who gradually becomes a criminal nicknamed the Jackal.

Production
The film was shot on location in Istanbul, Turkey.

Illustrator Korkut Akaçık, who made the film's storyboard sketches, is to adapt the film into a graphic novel.

Plot
The life of Akın, who lives in one of the poorest neighborhoods in Istanbul, begins to change after his mother’s death. He hopes to start a new life with the money he plans to steal from the carpenter's workshop he works at. His girlfriend, Deniz, finds his plan ridiculous and leaves him. Akın then accepts an offer by his friend İdris, which leads to a new start in his life. Having nothing to lose, Akın impresses his boss with his fearless and indifferent attitude, but a new life also brings with it a new host of enemies.

Release

Premiere
The film premiered in competition at the 47th Antalya "Golden Orange" International Film Festival (October 9 to 14, 2010).

General release

See also
 2010 in film
 Turkish films of 2010

References

External links
  
 

2010 films
2010s Turkish-language films
2010 action films
Films set in Turkey
Turkish action films
Turkish vigilante films
Turkish films about revenge